Andy O'Donnell may refer to:

 Andy O'Donnell (footballer) (1885–1965), Australian rules footballer
 Andy O'Donnell (basketball) (born 1925), American basketball player

See also
 Andrew O'Donnell, Scottish actor and co-founder of the Glasgow Filmmakers Alliance